Cotoneaster acuminatus, commonly known as acuminate cotoneaster, is a species of flowering plant in the family Rosaceae that is native to the Himalayas. The species has also been introduced to Oregon.

Description

Distribution
The species is found in Bhutan, Nepal, China (Sichuan, Xizang, Yunnan), and India (Sikkim).

References

acuminatus
Flora of China